State Route 114 (SR 114) is a route through southern Maine from U.S. Route 1 (US 1) and SR 9 and SR 207 in Scarborough to US 302 and SR 11 in Naples. The entire route is in Cumberland County.

Route description
SR 114 begins at an intersection with US 1/SR 9 and SR 207 in Scarborough. There, it heads northwest into Gorham. It has a short concurrency with SR 22. It goes through the city's center and junctions US 202 and SR 4 and SR 25. It heads into Standish and junctions SR 35. Then it follows the Sebago Lake coast into Sebago. From there it carries SR 11 from its previous concurrency with SR 107. It carries SR 11 to its northern end in Naples. SR 11 turns east with US 302 towards Casco.

Junction list

References

External links

Floodgap Roadgap's RoadsAroundME: Maine State Route 114

114
Transportation in Cumberland County, Maine